Underground 2 may refer to:
 Need for Speed: Underground 2, a 2004 racing video game
 Tony Hawk's Underground 2, a 2004 skateboarding video game
 LP Underground 2.0, a 2002 CD and digital download set by Linkin Park Underground
 Underground Vol. 2: Club Memphis, a compilation album by Three 6 Mafia

See also
 Underground (disambiguation)